Kedestes marshalli, Marshall's ranger, is a butterfly in the family Hesperiidae. It is found in Zimbabwe.

Adults are on wing all year, except in the winter months.

References

Butterflies described in 1925
m
Endemic fauna of Zimbabwe
Butterflies of Africa